The GMT800 was a General Motors full-size truck platform used from the 1999 through 2006 model years. It is the foundation for the Chevrolet Silverado and GMC Sierra pickups; and the derivative GMT820 and GMT830 versions for the Chevrolet Tahoe/GMC Yukon and the Chevrolet Suburban/GMC Yukon XL full-size SUVs, respectively. This platform was the successor to the GMT400 series of C/K pickups and SUVs, and was replaced for 2007 by the GMT900 line.

The GMT800 frames were manufactured by Magna International in Ramos Arizpe, Coahuila, Mexico and St. Thomas, Ontario, Canada. Trucks were assembled in Oshawa, Ontario; Pontiac, Michigan; Fort Wayne, Indiana; and Flint, Michigan; for pickup & chassis cab models, and Silao, Mexico; Janesville, Wisconsin; and Arlington, Texas; for SUV models. The GMT820-based Hummer H2 was built under contract by AM General at a specially-constructed plant in Mishawaka, Indiana. A GMT810 2 door SUV variant was designed and prototyped, but was not put into production.

The GMT800 introduced a three-section frame system. This could be mixed and matched depending on the wheelbase, GVWR, and body type fitted to the platform, rather than a single-piece long frame.  The front section was hydroformed, while the middle and rear sections were roll formed or stamped, depending on application.  This gives greater flexibility to the platform. A total of four front modules, seven midsections, and four rear sections were designed, and supported nearly 40 truck configurations.

The GMT800 pickup models used a rear-leaf spring suspension, while the GMT820/830 SUV models used a five-link coil-spring suspension.  (The 2500 series GMT830 SUV models retained a leaf spring suspension.)

The GMT800 was the first truck application for the then-new GM Generation III V8 engines.  The 4.8 L and 5.3 L versions used iron blocks and aluminum heads, while early 6.0 L version used cast iron cylinder heads.  The 6.6 L Duramax turbo-diesel was introduced with the 2500, 2500HD, and 3500 models that debuted for 2001.

The GMT800 1500 Chevrolet Silverado was named the MotorTrend Truck of the Year for 1999, the 2500 HD was awarded Truck of the Year for 2001, and the Chevrolet Avalanche was the Truck of the Year for 2002.

Sales

Applications

See also

 GM GMT platform

References

General Motors platforms